Elaina Tabb ( Balouris, b. Dec. 17, 1991) is an American long-distance runner from Pittsburgh, Pennsylvania. Tabb trains in Boston, Massachusetts.

Professional
Tabb runs professionally for the Boston Athletic Association that is supported by Adidas since 2014.

She placed 17th in a time of 1:12:29 at 2018 Aramco Half Marathon in Houston, qualified to represent Team USA at 2018 IAAF World Half Marathon Championships and placed 64th.

In December, Tabb placed 7th at 2017 USATF National Club Cross Country Championships in Lexington, Kentucky in a time of 20:01.0. In May, she ran 10,000 m at 2017 Payton Jordan Invite in 32:34.73 and qualified to 2017 USA Outdoor Track and Field Championships where she finished 9th in 10,000 meters in a time of 32:48.76. In February, she placed 6th at 2017 USA Cross Country Championships in Bend, Oregon in 36:18.3 and qualified to 2017 IAAF World Cross Country Championships in March in Kampala, Uganda where she placed 46th in 36:26. In March, she placed 10th at the USATF 15 km road championship in Jacksonville, Florida in 51:49.

On June 11, 2016 at the Portland Track Festival - Tabb finished 6th in 32:27.28 at 10 km. Tabb finished in seventh place in 19:52 at the 2016 USA Club Cross Country Championships in Tallahassee, Florida.

Tabb qualified for the 2015 IAAF World Cross Country Championships by finishing in sixth place (the final world team qualifying spot) at the 2015 USA Cross Country Championships.  At those world championships she finished in 64th place.

Tabb finished 14th in 32:39 at 2014 Tufts 10 km.

International

USA National Championships

Cross country

Track and field

Elaina Balouris represented Boston Athletic Association at the 10,000 meter Final at the 2015 USATF Outdoor championships.
Elaina Balouris placed 13th at 2015 USA Outdoor Track and Field Championships in 34:03.72.

Road

College
In college, Balouris competed for the College of William & Mary where she was a six-time All-American.

References

External links

 
 
 All-Athletics profile for Elaina Balouris 
 William and Mary profile for Elaina Balouris

1991 births
Living people
American female middle-distance runners
American female long-distance runners
Track and field athletes from Boston
Sportspeople from Pittsburgh
Track and field people from Pennsylvania
William & Mary Tribe women's track and field athletes
World Athletics Championships athletes for the United States
William & Mary Tribe women's cross country runners
Athletes (track and field) at the 2019 Pan American Games
Pan American Games track and field athletes for the United States
21st-century American women